The Jessie Stevenson Kovalenko Medal is awarded every two years by the US National Academy of Sciences "for important contributions to the medical sciences." It was first awarded in 1952 and involves a prize of $25,000 plus $50,000 for research.

The Kovalenko Fund was donated by Michael S. Kovalenko in 1949 to the National Academy of Sciences in memory of his wife, Jessie Stevenson Kovalenko.

Recipients

See also

 List of medicine awards
 Prizes named after people

References

Awards established in 1952
Medicine awards
Awards of the United States National Academy of Sciences